Brian K. Brown (born October 19, 1978) is an American professional dirt track racing driver who primarily competes in sprint car racing such as the World of Outlaws for his team Brian Brown Racing. He is a five-time track champion at Knoxville Raceway with four in the 410 sprint car class and one in the 360 division.

Brown has also competed in the NASCAR Camping World Truck Series and Superstar Racing Experience.

Racing career
In 1999, Brown won Rookie of the Year honors at Missouri State Fair Speedway while driving for his uncle Danny Lasoski. The following year, he claimed the Missouri State Fair's Winged Outlaw Warrior championship with 11 feature race wins.

Brown began racing at Knoxville in 2002 for Lasoski, a seven-time champion at the track. Competing in the 360-cubic-inch sprint car division, he won six races, including three in a row, en route to the championship. He moved up to the 410 class in 2003 with new car owner Lonny Parsons, with whom he won his first 410 race and Rookie of the Year as he placed seventh in points. After one year with Parsons, Brown joined Tim and Gina Doogs. After finishing second in the 2006 410 standings by five points, Brown won the next season's championship. He was also awarded the Hard Charger in the 2007 Knoxville Nationals.

He formed Brian Brown Racing in 2008. A second Knoxville 410 title came in 2010 as he won 12 races; he also started on the pole position in that year's Nationals. From 2012 to 2014, he finished second three consecutive times in the Nationals. In 2014, he won his first World of Outlaws Sprint Car Series race at Charlotte Motor Speedway.

Brown won a fourth Knoxville 410 championship in 2019, and also scored his first World of Outlaws victory at the track. He repeated as champion the next year, a campaign that saw him win his 50th career race at Knoxville.

In May 2021, Brown set the fastest lap time in Knoxville history at 14.351 seconds to surpass the record set by Brooke Tatnell of 14.407 in 2006. A month later, he joined the Superstar Racing Experience for the Knoxville race, where he drove a multi-driver local track champions car; he finished eighth in the feature. In July, he made his NASCAR Camping World Truck Series debut at Knoxville in the No. 51 for Kyle Busch Motorsports.

Motorsports career results

NASCAR
(key) (Bold – Pole position awarded by qualifying time. Italics – Pole position earned by points standings or practice time. * – Most laps led.)

Camping World Truck Series

Superstar Racing Experience
(key) * – Most laps led. 1 – Heat 1 winner. 2 – Heat 2 winner.

 Season still in progress
 Ineligible for series points

References

External links
 

Living people
1978 births
People from Higginsville, Missouri
NASCAR drivers
Racing drivers from Missouri
World of Outlaws drivers
Kyle Busch Motorsports drivers